Ercole (Y 430) is a Coastal tugboat of the Marina Militare

History 
Ercole (Y 430) is a tugboat designed on Damen Azimuth Stern Drive Tug 2810 plans.
It was built in Damen Shipyards to Gdynia (Poland) and was delivered to Italian maritime operator Rimorchiatori Riuniti Spezzini La Spezia, in October 2002, named Levanto Secondo.
In 2013 it was sell to AID Agenzia Industrie Difesa (Defence Factories Agency) for Marina Militare.
Ercole (Y 430) was update in Arsenale militare marittimo di Messina with new Voith propellers.

References

External links
 Ships Marina Militare website

Auxiliary ships of the Italian Navy
Ships built in Gdynia
2002 ships
Tugboats